K. K. Rathnam (8 August 1930 – 26 January 2023), known as Judo. K. K. Rathnam, was an Indian fight master and action choreographer in Kollywood, Bollywood, Mollywood, Sandalwood and Tollywood. He made his debut as an actor in the film Thamarai Kulam in 1959, and later made his debut as a stunt master in the film Vallavan Oruvan in 1966. He made his last appearance as an actor before retirement in the film Thalainagaram in 2006. Stunt masters and actors such as Vikram Dharma, Super Subbarayan, Thalapathy Dinesh, Jaguar Thangam, Rocky Rajesh, Rambo Rajkumar, FEFSI Vijayan, Ponnambalam, Judo. K. K. Ramu, Indian Baskar, Rajasekhar, Ambur. R. S. Babu, M. Shahul Hameed and Kundrathur Babu have worked as fighters and assistants to him. His son Judo. K. K. Ramu is also a stunt master, while his grandsons Judo Lenin and John Prince are stunt artists.

Rathnam died on 26 January 2023, at age 92.

Filmography
 1966 Vallavan Oruvan
 1966 Iru Vallavargal
 1967 Madi Veettu Mappillai
 1967 Ethirigal Jakkirathai
 1967 Kadhalithal Podhuma
 1968 Thanga Valayal
 1968 Muthu Chippi
 1968 Deiveega Uravu
 1969 Thulabaram
 1970 Dharisanam
 1971 Thanga Gopuram
 1972 Bathilukku Bathil
 1972 Kasethan Kadavulada
 1975 Hotel Sorgam
 1977 Gaayathri 
 1977 Nallathukku Kaalamillai
 1978 Mela Thalangal
 1979 Pancha Kalyani
 1980 Murattu Kaalai
 1980 Othaiyadi Pathaiyile
 1981 Netrikkann
 1981 Nenjil Oru Mul
 1981 Sivappu Malli
 1982 Pokkiri Raja
 1982 Sagalakala Vallavan
 1982 Chinnan Chirusugal
 1982 Theeratha Vilayattu Pillai
 1982 Kanne Radha
 1982 Puthukavithai
 1982 Pakkathu Veetu Roja
 1982 Enkeyo Ketta Kural
 1982 Theerpugal Thiruththapadalam
 1982 Anandha Ragam
 1983 Uruvangal Maralam
 1983 Malaiyoor Mambattiyan
 1983 Oru Kai Parppom
 1983 Paayum Puli
 1983 Thangaikkor Geetham
 1983 Uyirullavarai Usha
 1983 Thudikkum Karangal
 1983 Puthisali Paithiyangal
 1983 Naan Soottiya Malar
 1983 Sivappu Sooriyan 
 1983 Mundhanai Mudichu
 1983 Valartha Kada
 1983 Thoongadhey Thambi Thoongadhey
 1983 Kairasikkaran
 1983 Soorakottai Singakutti
 1983 Adutha Varisu
 1984 Madurai Sooran
 1984 Naan Mahaan Alla
 1984 Thambikku Entha Ooru
 1984 Sabash
 1984 Magudi
 1984 Thiruppam
 1984 Nerupukkul Eeram
 1984 Neengal Kettavai 
 1984 Niyayam
 1984 Neram Nalla Neram
 1984 Kai Kodukkum Kai 
 1984 Iru Medhaigal
 1984 Mudivalla Arambam
 1984 Nallavanukku Nallavan
 1984 Rajathanthiram
 1984 Naanayamillatha Naanayam
 1985 Padikkadavan
 1985 Oru Kaidhiyin Diary
 1985 Avan
 1985 Veettukkari
 1985 Ketti Melam
 1985 Mappillai Singam
 1985 Ragasiyam
 1985 Nermai
 1985 Partha Gnabagam Illayo
 1985 Yaar?
 1985 Oru Malarin Payanam
 1985 Puthiya Sagaptham
 1985 Eetti
 1985 Deivapiravi
 1985 Raja Yuvaraja
 1985 Paadum Vaam Paadi
 1985 Urimai
 1985 Vetrikkani
 1985 Ilamai
 1985 Sigappu Kili
 1985 Thalaimagan
 1985 Uyarndha Ullam
 1985 Mangamma Sabadham
 1985 Nalla Thambi
 1985 Mookkanan Kayiru
 1985 Unnai Thedi Varuven
 1985 Ketti Melam
 1985 Arthamulla Aasaigal
 1985 Chinna Veedu
 1986 Engal Thaaikkulame Varuga
 1986 Dharma Devathai
 1986 Mr. Bharath
 1986 Kulirkaala Megangal
 1986 Kaalamellam Un Madiyil
 1986 Murattu Karangal
 1986 Kadaikkan Parvai
 1986 Mounam Kalaikirathu
 1986 Naanum Oru Thozhilali
 1986 Jeevanadhi
 1986 Viduthalai
 1987 Manithan
 1987 Cooliekkaran
 1987 Shankar Guru
 1987 Anjatha Singam
 1987 Enga Chinna Rasa
 1987 Per Sollum Pillai
 1988 Guru Sishyan
 1988 Paatti Sollai Thattathe
 1988 Idhu Namma Aalu
 1988 Senthoora Poove
 1988 Vasanthi
 1988 Dharmathin Thalaivan
 1988 Irandil Ondru
 1988 Manamagale Vaa
 1988 Kazhugumalai Kallan
 1989 Meenakshi Thiruvilayadal
 1989 Dravidan
 1989 Raja Chinna Roja
 1989 Sonthakkaran
 1989 Dilly Babu
 1989 Dharma Devan
 1989 Vaai Kozhuppu
 1989 En Rathathin Rathame
 1990 Ulagam Pirandhadhu Enakkaga
 1990 Amma Pillai
 1990 Athisaya Piravi
 1990 Pengal Veettin Kangal
 1990 Pudhu Varisu
 1990 Enkitta Mothathe
 1990 En Kadhal Kanmani
 1990 Pudhu Pudhu Ragangal
 1990 Aatha Naan Pass Ayittaen
 1991 Nenjamundu Nermaiundu
 1992 Sakalakala Vandugal
 1992 Kaaval Geetham
 1992 Therku Theru Machan
 1992 Mudhal Kural
 1992 Pandiyan

Actor
 1959 Thamarai Kulam
 1963 Konjum Kumari
 1977 Gaayathri
 1982 Pokkiri Raja
 1984 Naanayamillatha Naanayam
 1992 Ponnukketha Purushan
 2006 Thalainagaram

Producer
 1980 Othaiyadi Pathaiyile

Awards and honours
 2013 Guinness Book of Records - Guinness World Record for working in more than 1200 films as a stunt coordinator.
 2016 Sankaradas Swamigal Award.
 2019 Kalaimamani Awards from the Government of Tamil Nadu.

References

External links

1930 births
2023 deaths
20th-century Indian male actors
Indian action choreographers
Male actors from Tamil Nadu
Male actors in Tamil cinema
People from Vellore district